The Ranfurly Shield, colloquially known as the Log o' Wood, is perhaps the most prestigious trophy in New Zealand's domestic rugby union competition. First played for in 1904, the Ranfurly Shield is based on a challenge system, rather than a league or knockout competition as with most football trophies. The holding union must defend the Shield in challenge matches, and if a challenger defeats them, they become the new holder of the Shield.

Holders

Fixtures

2010

2011

2012

2013

2014

2015

2016

2017

2018

2019

Top points scorers

Points scorers

Last updated: after Waikato's match against Southland on 29 September 2018.

Try scorers

Last updated: after Canterbury's match against North Harbour on 13 October 2019.

See also

Rugby union in New Zealand
Hanan Shield
Mitre 10 Cup

Table footnotes

References

External links

Ranfurly Shield
Rugby union trophies and awards
New Zealand rugby union competitions
New Zealand sports trophies and awards
2010 in New Zealand rugby union
2011 in New Zealand rugby union
2012 in New Zealand rugby union
2013 in New Zealand rugby union
2014 in New Zealand rugby union
2015 in New Zealand rugby union
2016 in New Zealand rugby union
2017 in New Zealand rugby union
2018 in New Zealand rugby union